Pachacuti Inca Yupanqui was the ninth Sapa Inca (1418–1471/1472) of the Kingdom of Cusco which he transformed into the Inca Empire. Most archaeologists now believe that the famous Inca site of Machu Picchu was built as an estate for Pachacuti.

In Quechua Pachakutiq means "reformer of the world", and Yupanki means "with honor". During his reign, Cusco grew from a hamlet into an empire that could compete with, and eventually overtake, the Chimú. He began an era of conquest that, within three generations, expanded the Inca dominion from the valley of Cusco to nearly the whole of western South America. According to chronicler Garcilaso de la Vega, Pachacuti created the Inti Raymi to celebrate the new year in the Andes of the Southern Hemisphere. Pachacuti is often linked to the origin and expansion of the Inti Sun Cult.

Biographies
Pachacutec was the ninth ruler of the Inca state who, from ruling a simple chiefdom, came to rule a great empire, the Tawantinsuyu.

He was born in Cusco, in the palace of Cusicancha, bordering the Coricancha temple. His tutor, Micuymana, taught him history, laws and language, as well as the handling of quipus. From a very young age he was admired by the Inca nobles because he had the courage, intelligence and maturity that his brother, Inca Urco (who had been named as successor of Viracocha Inca), lacked. In the same way, he showed aptitudes for government and conquest that his brother likewise lacked.

Although he had not been designated as successor by his father, Viracocha Inca, he led a military defense against the warlike army of Chanka while his father and his brother, Inca Urco, fled the manor. The victory over the Chankas made Inca Viracocha recognize him as his successor around 1438.

As part of his vision of a statesman and warrior chieftain he conquered many ethnic groups and states, highlighting his conquest of the Collao that enhanced the prestige of the Inca Pachacutec. Due to the remarkable expansion of their domains he was considered an exceptional leader, enlivening glorious epic stories and hymns in tribute to his achievements. Numerous kurakas do not hesitate to recognise his skills and identify him as the "Son of the Sun".

He conquered the provinces of Colla-Suyu and Chinchay-Suyu. Along with his sons, Tupac Ayar Manco (or Amaru Tupac Inca), and Apu Paucar Usnu, he defeated the Colla-Suyuns.  Additionally, he left garrisons in subjugated lands.

Lineage
Pachacuti, son of Inca Viracocha and Mama Runtu, was the fourth of the Hanan dynasty. His wife's name was Mama Anahuarqui, or Quya Anawarkhi (Coya Anahurque). She was a native of Ayllu Chocco. He had three sons, Tupac Ayar Manco, Apu Paucar, and Tupac Inca Yupanqui.

Pachacuti had his two brothers, Capac Yupanqui and Huayana Yupanqui, killed after the military campaign against the province of Chinchay-Suyu.  He also killed his sons Tilca Yupanqui and Auqui Yupanqui.

Amaru, the older son, was originally chosen to be co-regent and eventual successor. Pachacuti later chose Tupac Inca because Amaru was not a warrior. He was also the first one to retire.

Succession
Pachacuti's given name was Cusi Yupanqui and he was not supposed to succeed his father Inca Viracocha who had appointed his brother Urco as crown prince. However, in the midst of an invasion of Cusco by the Chankas, the Incas' traditional tribal archenemies, Pachacuti had a real opportunity to demonstrate his talent. While his father and brother fled the scene, Pachacuti rallied the army and prepared for a desperate defense of his homeland. In the resulting battle, the Chankas were defeated so severely that legend tells even the stones rose up to fight on Pachacuti's side. Pachacuti became known as "The Earth Shaker" following the battle, and won the support of his people. Pachacuti captured many Chanka leaders, who Pachacuti presented to his father Viracocha for him to wipe his feet on their bodies, a traditional victory ritual. Viracocha told Pachacuti that the honor of the ritual belonged to the next Inca: Urco.  Pachacuti protested and said that he had not won the victory for his brothers to step on the Chanka captives. A heated argument ensued, and Viracocha later tried to have Pachacuti assassinated. Pachacuti was tipped off to the plot, however, and the assassination plot failed.  Viracocha went into exile while Pachacuti returned in triumph to Cusco, and renamed himself "Pachacuti" (meaning "Earth Shaker").

Pachacuti rebuilt much of Cusco, designing it to serve the needs of an imperial city and as a representation of the empire. Each suyu had a sector of the city, centering on the road leading to that province; nobles and immigrants lived in the sector corresponding to their origin. Each sector was further divided into areas for the hanan (upper) and hurin (lower) moieties. Many of the most renowned monuments around Cusco, such as the great sun temple Qurikancha, were rebuilt during Pachacuti's reign.

Despite his political and military talents, Pachacuti did not improve the system of succession. His son became the next Inca without any known dispute after Pachacuti died in 1471 due to a terminal illness. But in future generations, the next Inca had to gain control of the empire by winning enough support from the apos, priesthood, and military to win a civil war or intimidate anyone else from trying to wrest control of the empire.

Pachacuti is also credited with having displaced hundreds of thousands in massive programs of relocation and resettling them to colonize the most remote edges of his empire. These forced colonists were called mitimaes and represented the lowest place in the Incan social hierarchy. The Incan imperial government was highly authoritative and repressive.

He sent his son Tupac Inca Yupanqui an army to repeat his conquests, and extend his realm to Quito.  Pachacuti then built irrigating channels, cultivated terraces, made roads and hospices.  The Road of the Inca stretched from Quito to Chile.

Pachacuti was a poet and the author of the Sacred Hymns of the Situa city purification ceremony. Pedro Sarmiento de Gamboa attributed one song to Pachacuti on his deathbed: "I was born as a lily in the garden, and like the lily I grew, as my age advanced / I became old and had to die, and so I withered and died."

In popular culture
 Pachacuti is featured as the leader of the Inca in the video games Civilization III, Civilization V, and Civilization VI.
 Pachacutec, a resurrected Sapa Inca king who is over 500 years old, plays a major role in James Rollins' novel  Excavation, whose major action occurs in the Peruvian Andes. The book is steeped in history and culture about the Inca, Moche, and Quechan peoples, their interactions with the Dominican Order and Spanish Conquistadors, and the Spanish Inquisition.
 He was portrayed in the American documentary series Mankind: The Story of All of Us.
 The BBC children's series Horrible Histories featured Pachacuti, played by Mathew Baynton, in the song "Do the Pachacuti" (a parody of novelty party songs) during its second series.
 Pachakutiq is the name of a character played by Clark Gregg in season six of the Marvel TV series Agents of S.H.I.E.L.D. — not the Incan emperor, but a character who might be said to be a "he who overturns space and time" in a certain sense.
 The video game Age of Empires II: Definitive Edition contains a five-chapter campaign titled "Pachacuti".

Gallery

References

Works cited

External links 

1418 births
1471 deaths
Inca emperors
15th-century South American people
15th-century monarchs in South America